The 1992–93 Luxembourg National Division was the 79th season of top level association football in Luxembourg.

Overview
It was performed in 10 teams, and FC Avenir Beggen won the championship.

First phase

Table

Results

Second phase

Championship stage

Table

Results

Relegation/Promotion stage

Group A

Table

Group B

Table

References
Luxembourg - List of final tables (RSSSF)

Luxembourg National Division seasons
Luxembourg
1